Konstantin Kisin (born 25 December 1982) is a Russian-British satirist, podcaster, author and political commentator. Kisin has written for a number of publications including Quillette, The Spectator, The Daily Telegraph and Standpoint on issues relating to tech censorship, woke culture, comedy and "culture war" topics in the past but currently publishes articles on these subjects on his Substack. He has co-hosted Triggernometry since 2018, a YouTube channel and podcast featuring fellow comedian and co-host Francis Foster.

Background 
Kisin was born and grew up in Moscow in the former Soviet Union. He came from a family of Jewish heritage. His experiences in the country inform much of his own political views today. At age 11, he moved to the United Kingdom.

Career 

Since April 2018, Kisin has been co-presenter of the show Triggernometry, a YouTube channel and podcast. The show is dedicated to free speech and open discussion on a range of controversial topics, featuring guests from diverse backgrounds. Guests have included Sam Harris, Bret Weinstein, Douglas Murray, Jordan Peterson, Destiny, Adam Carolla, Bill Burr, Andrew Doyle, David Frost, Theo Von, Coleman Hughes, Matt Walsh, Louise Perry, Peter Hitchens, Mark Blyth, Andrew Adonis, Diana Fleischman, Scott Adams, Laurence Fox, Carl Benjamin, Melanie Phillips, Rod Liddle, Julia Hartley-Brewer, John Curtice, Matthew Goodwin, Helen Dale, Calvin Robinson, Steven Woolfe, Geoff Norcott, Kathleen Stock, Paul Embery, Katharine Birbalsingh, Nigel Farage, Toby Young, Ariel Pink, and Debbie Hayton.

In 2019 he took his show Orwell That Ends Well to the Edinburgh Festival Fringe to mixed reviews. The Daily Telegraph included the show in its list of best comedy shows of the Edinburgh Festival, the Student described it as "hilarious and refreshing", while Fest Magazine called it "ill-considered, reactionary nonsense" and The Jewish Chronicle described Kisin as an "antagonist" and rated the show 2/5. Kisin confirmed in 2022 while appearing on the Joe Rogan Experience  that he is currently on a break from stand-up.

In March 2022 he appeared as a panellist on the first edition of BBC Question Time following the Russian invasion of Ukraine. He talked about how he feels nothing but shame for his birth-country (Russia), and how his family in Ukraine are being bombarded.

Kisin is the author of An Immigrant's Love Letter to the West, which became a Sunday Times bestseller in the first week of its publication.

In 2023 Kisin participated in one of the Oxford Union Society debates, arguing that the global climate crisis could not be solved by "woke" protests in rich countries but only by technological advances towards clean energy.

SOAS University of London appearance clash 

In 2018 Kisin made headlines when he refused to sign a "behavioural agreement" form explaining a "no tolerance policy" with regard to racism, sexism, classism, ageism, homophobia, biphobia, xenophobia, Islamophobia, anti-religion and anti-atheism when asked to perform at a fundraising gig for UNICEF at SOAS, University of London. The form explained those topics were not banned, but stated the topics should be discussed in a "respectful and non-abusive way" and presented in a way that is "respectful and kind".

After Kisin refused to agree to those terms and chose not to perform, the UNICEF on Campus society at SOAS apologised and clarified they did not wish to "impose that guests would have to agree to anything they do not believe in". The SOAS Students' Union said that it did not require external speakers to sign any contract before appearances, and that the UNICEF on Campus society had been "overzealous" in interpreting the guidelines.

Justifying his actions after it was claimed that Kisin had agreed to similar restrictions for a different gig in 2017, he stated he was "absolutely certain there was nothing about religion, atheism, respect or kindness in the rules [of the 2017 contract]. Had there been, I would not have agreed."

References

External links 
 Konstantin Kisin on The Telegraph
 Konstantin Kisin on The Spectator
Konstantin Kisin on Twitter

20th-century births
21st-century Russian people
British people of Russian-Jewish descent
Russian emigrants to the United Kingdom
Russian Jews
Jewish British comedians
British comedians
British stand-up comedians
Free speech activists
Year of birth missing (living people)
Living people
Jewish Russian comedians